The Last Meeting is a 1967 Spanish drama film directed by Antonio Eceiza. It was entered into the 1967 Cannes Film Festival.

Cast
 Antonio Gades - Antonio Esteve
 Daniel Martín (actor) - Juan
 Calderas - tango singer
 Francisco Carames
 Pepe de la Peña - dancer
 Perico el del Lunar - guitarist
 Emilio de Diego - guitarist
 Enrique Esteve - dancer
 Cristina Hoyos - dancer (as Cristina)
 José Luna 'El Tauro' - dancer
 Juan Maya - guitarist
 José Meneses - martinete singer
 Daniel Moya - guitarist
 Félix Ordóñez - dancer

References

External links

1967 films
1960s Spanish-language films
1967 drama films
Spanish black-and-white films
Films directed by Antonio Eceiza
1960s Spanish films